Affinium may refer to:

 Affinium Pharmaceuticals, a Toronto, Canada, based biotechnology company, founded by Aled Edwards and John Mendlein
 The Affinium marketing software suite produced by Unica Corporation